Dr. R. Leela Devi (13 February 1932 – 19 May 1998) was an Indian writer, translator, and teacher who wrote in English, Malayalam, and Sanskrit. She was from the state of Kerala.

Profession

Writer and translator 
Dr. R. Leela Devi wrote and translated more than 300 books with her husband V. Balakrishnan. She translated the Marthandavarma, Narayaneeyam, and Vidur Gita (Mahabharata), among others, and contributed to the English language section of the book Contribution of Writers to Indian Freedom Movement (see Indian independence movement).

Theatre
She translated Chandu Menon's Indulekha into English as Crescent Moon.

Selected works
From Representation to Participation – the first book on Panchayatiraj- Sri Satguru Publications (Delhi)
Sarojini Naidu – biography
Blue Jasmine – fantasy novel
Saffron – a novel about the myths and legends of Kashmir
Mannatthu Padmanabhan and the Revival of Nairs in Kerala – the renaissance of the Nairs and their history
An Epoch in Kerala History
History of Malayalam Literature
Kerala History
Influence of English on Malayalam Literature
Indian National Congress – Hundred Years – history of the Indian National Congress, published for Congress Centenary.
A Handbook of English Teaching
Ethics(In various Religions of the World)- Sri Satguru Publications (Delhi)
Vedic Gods and Some Hymns- Sri Satguru Publications (Delhi)
Vidura Gita- Text & English Translation- Sri Satguru Publications (Delhi)
Naganandam by Harshavardhana- Sri Satguru Publications (Delhi)

References

External links 

 http://www.malayalamebooks.org

1932 births
1998 deaths
Indian women dramatists and playwrights
Malayalam-language writers
20th-century Indian women writers
20th-century Indian dramatists and playwrights
Writers from Kerala
20th-century Indian translators
English-language writers from India
Indian political writers
Indian women political writers
People from Pala, Kerala
Indian women non-fiction writers
Women biographers
20th-century Indian biographers
Sanskrit writers
Women writers from Kerala
Indian women translators